Sheer Qorma  (Urdu: شير قرمہ‎, romanized: shîr qurmâ "milk and dates") a 2021 Indian short film Drama LGBT romance written and directed by Faraz Arif Ansari of Sisak fame and produced by Marijke Desouza. It is produced by Futterwacken Films. Starring Shabana Azmi, Divya Dutta and Swara Bhaskar, the film revolves around a woman and a non-binary person (played by Dutta and Swara Bhaskar) in love with each other. The filming began in the first week of August 2019 in Mumbai.

Cast
 Shabana Azmi as Ammi
 Divya Dutta as Saira
 Swara Bhaskar as Sitara
 Priya Malik as Susan, Ammi's daughter in law

Accolades

The film won Best Short Film Audience Award at the Frameline Film Festival and also qualified for the British Academy Film Awards 2021.

References

External links
 
 

Indian romantic drama films
Indian LGBT-related films
Lesbian-related films
LGBT-related coming-of-age films
LGBT-related romantic drama films
2021 LGBT-related films
2021 films
Indian short films
LGBT-related short films